Asignatura pendiente is a 1977 Spanish drama film co-written and directed by José Luis Garci.

The film was one of the most successful films in the 1970s with 2,305,924 admissions. It was the highest-grossing Spanish film in 1977 grossing 193 million pesetas ($2.5 million).

Nowadays, it is viewed as a portrayal of society during the Spanish transition to democracy.

Plot summary
José and Elena were friends. They share everything, except for some unfinished business: sex. Now, with the return of democracy to the country, both have remained friends, but married to other people, and now become lovers. José is involved in politics.

Cast
José Sacristán (José)
Fiorella Faltoyano (Elena)
Antonio Gamero
Silvia Tortosa
Héctor Alterio
Simón Andreu (Paco)
María Casanova (Pili)

Songs
Two songs are emblematic in the film: Mikis Theodorakis's Honeymoon song by Gloria Lasso, and 15 años tiene mi amor (My love is 15 years old) by Duo Dinamico.

External links

Notes and references 

1977 films
1970s Spanish-language films
1977 drama films
Films with screenplays by José Luis Garci
Spanish drama films
Films directed by José Luis Garci
1970s Spanish films